This is a list of monuments that are classified by the Moroccan ministry of culture around Sidi Kacem.

Monuments and sites in Sidi Kacem

|}

References 

Sidi Kacem
Sidi Kacem Province